Industry on Parade was a short television program that aired in the United States from 1950–1960. It was produced by the National Association of Manufacturers (NAM). The show depicts complicated industrial processes that transform raw materials into finished products available for consumption by Americans. Its episodes generally contain several sections, each of which looks at a different aspect of some larger topic within industry.

The show was nationally syndicated, and local stations could show it free of charge—which they did, in a wide range of different time slots. Footage was also distributed widely among American schools and community organizations. Ratings information is scarce but existing local reports suggest that the show was quite popular.

History
The show was reportedly conceived by Johnny Johnstone, the director of television and radio at NAM.

NAM collaborated with NBC in producing the show from 1950–1953. (NBC producer Arthur Lodge continued to work with the show until it ended in 1960.)

The series received a Peabody Award for National Public Service in 1954.

In 1958, the show changed formats, recycling and rearranging old footage to provide broader overviews of different industries.

In total, Industry on Parade aired more than 500 episodes during its 10 years in existence. These reels were donated to the National Museum of American History in 1974, and held by the Division of Agriculture and Natural Resources until being transferred to the Archives Center in 1994.

Themes
The show promotes capitalist industrial production and typically ends with an anticommunist message. The success of Industry on Parade provoked the AFL–CIO to demand its own "public service" time on television, which they obtained and used to broadcast Americans at Work (1958–1961).

The show generally depicts and promotes women in the workforce.

References

External links 

 Industry on Parade Film Collection at the Archives Center, National Museum of American History

1950s American television series
1960s American television series
1950 American television series debuts
1960 American television series endings
NBC original programming
Manufacturing in the United States
Documentary television series about industry
Peabody Award-winning television programs